African swallow may refer to:

 Genus Cecropis, mud-nest building swallows:
 Lesser striped swallow, Cecropis abyssinica
 Greater striped swallow, Cecropis cucullata
 Red-rumped swallow, Cecropis daurica (range extends beyond Africa)
 West African swallow, Cecropis domicella
 Red-breasted swallow, Cecropis semirufa
 Mosque swallow, Cecropis senegalensis
 Genus Hirundo open-cup nesting swallows:
 Ethiopian swallow, Hirundo aethiopica
 White-throated swallow, Hirundo albigularis
 Angola swallow, Hirundo angolensis
 Blue swallow, Hirundo atrocaerulea
 Pearl-breasted swallow, Hirundo dimidiata
 Pied-winged swallow, Hirundo leucosoma
 Red-chested swallow, Hirundo lucida
 White-tailed swallow, Hirundo megaensis
 white-bibbed swallow, Hirundo nigrita
 Black-and-rufous swallow, Hirundo nigrorufa
 Barn swallow, Hirundo rustica (range extends beyond Africa, this is also the European swallow)
 Wire-tailed swallow, Hirundo smithii smithii
 Genus Petrochelidon, cliff nesting swallows:
 Forest swallow, Petrochelidon fuliginosa
 Preuss's cliff swallow, Petrochelidon preussi
 Red-throated cliff swallow, Petrochelidon rufigula
 South African cliff swallow, Petrochelidon spilodera
 Genus Pseudhirundo:
 Grey-rumped swallow, Pseudhirundo griseopyga

See also
 Swallow
 African swallowtail (Papilio dardanus)
 African Swallow-tailed Kite